Euptychoides is a genus of satyrid butterflies found in the Neotropical realm.

Species
Listed alphabetically:
Euptychoides albofasciata (Hewitson, 1869)
Euptychoides castrensis (Schaus, 1902)
Euptychoides eugenia (C. & R. Felder, 1867)
Euptychoides fida (Weymer, 1911)
Euptychoides griphe (C. & R. Felder, 1867)
Euptychoides hotchkissi (Dyar, 1913)
Euptychoides laccine (C. & R. Felder, 1867)
Euptychoides nossis (Hewitson, 1862)
Euptychoides pseudosaturnus Forster, 1964
Euptychoides saturnus (Butler, 1867)

References

Euptychiina
Butterfly genera
Taxa named by Walter Forster (entomologist)